Saajan Ki Baahon Mein (translation: A sweetheart in my arms) is a 1995 Indian Hindi-language romantic drama film directed by Jay Prakash and produced by Dinesh B. Patel. It stars Rishi Kapoor, Raveena Tandon, Tabu in pivotal roles.

Cast
 Rishi Kapoor as Sagar
 Raveena Tandon as	Sapna Narang
 Tabu as Kavita
 Sumeet Saigal as Rakesh Singh
 Prem Chopra as Pyarelal
 Deven Verma as Dr. Rastogi
 Saeed Jaffrey as Ranveer Singh
 Pran as Mr. Narang
 Laxmikant Berde as Anand

Soundtrack

References

External links

1990s Hindi-language films
1995 films
Films scored by Nadeem–Shravan
1995 romantic drama films